Stafford High School is a public high school in Stafford, Connecticut.  It serves grades 9-12 and offers a wide variety of programs.  It competes athletically as the Bulldogs in many different sports.

Athletics

Stafford High School offers the following sports:
 Football
 Field hockey
 Boys soccer
 Girls soccer 
 Cross country
 Indoor track and field
 Basketball
 Baseball
 Softball
 Wrestling
 Outdoor track and field 
 Golf
 Ice hockey

References

External links
 

Stafford, Connecticut